Dwomoh is an Ashanti surname. Dwomoh is a royal Ashanti surname which originated from Mampong in the Ashanti City-State. Notable people with the Ashanti surname include:

Benjamin Dwomoh (1935–2013), Ghanaian football referee
Irene Dwomoh (born 1986), Ghanaian beauty pageant winner 

Surnames of Ashanti origin
Surnames of Akan origin